Ghost Adventures is an American paranormal documentary and reality television series created by Zak Bagans and Nick Groff, airing on the Travel Channel. The series follows ghost hunters Zak Bagans, Nick Groff (seasons 1–10), and Aaron Goodwin as they investigate locations that are reported to be haunted. The show is introduced and narrated by Bagans.

Series overview

Episodes

Season 1 (2008)

Season 2 (2009)

Season 3 (2009–10)

Season 4 (2010–11)

Season 5 (2011)

Season 6 (2012)

Season 7 (2012–13)

Season 8 (2013)

Season 9 (2014)

Season 10 (2014–15)

Season 11 (2015)

Season 12 (2016)

Season 13 (2016–17)

Season 14 (2017)

Season 15 (2017–18)

Season 16 (2018)

Season 17 (2018)

Season 18 (2019)

Season 19 (2019–20)

Season 20 (2020–21) 

Beginning with the "House of Brujeria" episode, all episodes are exclusively premiered on Discovery+

Season 21 (2021)

Season 22 (2022)

Season 23 (2022)

Specials

References

General references

External links

Ghost Adventures
Lists of American non-fiction television series episodes